Elanex, Inc. commonly known as Elanex, is a translation services company based in San Francisco, California, USA. The company provides localization, translation, and interpreting services. Elanex primarily provides professional human translation, managed by an advanced internally developed technology platform. They primarily serve the high technology, financial services, manufacturing, energy, retail, and mergers and acquisitions (M&A) industries.

History 
The company was founded in 2002 by Jonathan Kirk, has operations in Silicon Valley, Seattle, Washington, New York, New York, San Francisco, California, USA; Tokyo, Japan; London, England; Sydney, Australia; Montreal, Quebec, Canada;.

In June, 2012, Elanex launched expressIt, a rapid response translation service that marries the best of professional human translators with AI-guided automatic workflow.

In September, 2014, Elanex launched VeriFast, a service that combines machine translation with expert human verification. Building on Elanex's automation and workflow technologies, it enables large volumes of content to be quickly translated and reviewed for accuracy.

See also
Translation Search Engine

References

External links
Elanex official site
expressIt official site

Companies established in 2002
Software companies based in California
Companies based in San Francisco
2002 establishments in California
Software companies of the United States
2002 establishments in the United States
Software companies established in 2002